Ilija may refer to:
 Ilija, Iran, a village in Ardabil Province, Iran
 Ilija, Slovakia, a village and municipality in the Banská Štiavnica District, in the Banská Bystrica Region
 Ilija (given name), South Slavic given name
ilija (puki) kanter

People with the surname
 Jože Ilija, Slovene canoeist

See also
 Sveti Ilija (disambiguation)